Theobroma  is a genus of flowering plants in the mallow family, Malvaceae, that is sometimes classified as a member of Sterculiaceae. It contains roughly 20 species of small understory trees native to the tropical forests of Central and South America. 

Theobroma cacao, the best known species of the genus, is used for making chocolate. Cupuaçu (Theobroma grandiflorum) and Mocambo (Theobroma bicolor) are also of some economic importance.

Taxonomy 
The generic name is derived from the Greek words  theos meaning "god" and  broma meaning "food" translating to "food of the gods".

Species 
Species of the genus according to Plants of the World Online :

Formerly placed here
Abroma augustum (L.) L.f. (as T. augustum L.)
Guazuma ulmifolia Lam. (as T. guazuma L.)
Herrania albiflora Goudot (as T. albiflorum (Goudot) De Wild.)
Herrania mariae (Mart.) Decne. ex Goudot (as T. mariae (Mart.) K. Schum.)
Herrania purpurea (Pittier) R. E. Schult. (as T. purpureum Pittier)

Uses
Several species of Theobroma produce edible seeds, notably cacao, cupuaçu, and mocambo. Cacao is commercially valued as the source of cocoa and chocolate.

Theobroma species are used as food plants by the larvae of some moths of the genus Endoclita, including E. chalybeatus, E. damor, E. hosei and E. sericeus. The larvae of another moth, Hypercompe muzina, feed exclusively on Theobroma cacao.

An active ingredient of cacao, theobromine, is named for the genus.

References

External links 

 
Malvaceae genera